The 2019 Indian Super League Final was the final match of the 2018–19 Indian Super League season, the fifth season of the Indian Super League. It was played between Bengaluru FC and FC Goa, on 17 March 2019 at the Mumbai Football Arena, Mumbai. It was played to determine the winner of the 2018–19 season  of the Indian Super League.

Bengaluru FC won their maiden Indian Super League title defeating FC Goa 1–0. Rahul Bheke of Bengaluru FC won the Man of the Match award for scoring the solitary goal in the 117 minute.

Background 
This was Bengaluru FC's second consecutive Indian Super League final after making their debut at the 2017–18 season. Bengaluru FC previously lost the final against Chennaiyin FC 2–3.

Match

References

External links
 Indian Super League Official Website.

Indian Super League finals
2018–19 Indian Super League season
2018–19 in Indian football
Indian Super League Final
Bengaluru FC matches
FC Goa matches